The Erysipelotrichia are a class of bacteria of the phylum Bacillota.  Species of this class are known to be common in the gut microbiome, as they have been isolated from swine manure and increase in composition of the mouse gut microbiome for mice switched to diets high in fat.

Phylogeny
The currently accepted taxonomy is based on the List of Prokaryotic names with Standing in Nomenclature (LPSN) and National Center for Biotechnology Information (NCBI)

♦ Paraphyletic Erysipelotrichia

See also
 List of bacterial orders
 List of bacteria genera

References

External links
 The Taxonomicon: Class Erysipelotrichi

 
Bacteria classes